Elias Whitmore (March 2, 1772 Pembroke, then in Hillsborough County, now in Merrimack County, New Hampshire – December 26, 1853 Windsor, Broome County, New York) was a United States representative from New York.

Life
He completed preparatory studies. He removed to Windsor, NY and engaged in mercantile pursuits.

Whitmore was elected as an Adams man to the 19th United States Congress, holding office from March 4, 1825, to March 3, 1827.

He was buried at the Village Cemetery in Windsor.

Sources

External links

1772 births
1853 deaths
People from Pembroke, New Hampshire
19th-century American politicians
People from Windsor, New York
American merchants
National Republican Party members of the United States House of Representatives from New York (state)